Michelle Paver (born 7 September 1960) is a British novelist and children's writer, known for the historical fantasy series Chronicles of Ancient Darkness, set in prehistoric Europe. For the sixth book of the series, Ghost Hunter (2009) she won the Guardian Children's Fiction Prize, a book award judged by a panel of British children's writers.

Biography 

Michelle Paver was born in Nyasaland (now Malawi) in central Africa. Her mother was Belgian (Flemish) and her South African father ran a newspaper, the Nyasaland Times. Her family settled in Wimbledon, England when she was three. She was educated at The Study and Wimbledon High School. After reading biochemistry at Lady Margaret Hall, University of Oxford, where she attained a first-class degree, she became a partner in a City of London law firm.

Her father's death in 1996 prompted her to take a one-year sabbatical, during which she travelled around France and America and wrote her first book, Without Charity. She resigned from legal practice soon after her return, to concentrate on writing. Her 2010 ghost novel Dark Matter was nominated for a Shirley Jackson Award for best novel.

Chronicles of Ancient Darkness

The Chronicles of Ancient Darkness tell the story of Torak, a twelve-year-old boy who is clanless, and his friends Renn and Wolf. The main story arc revolves around Torak and his quest to defeat the Soul Eaters, a group of evil clan mages who seek out to destroy all life in the forest in which they live. The books are set in prehistoric Europe during the New Stone Age.

The first of the series, Wolf Brother was published in 2004 and as a whole the books have sold over 1 million copies in the UK. Paver was paid a reported £2.8 million advance for the first book.

Gods and Warriors

Michelle Paver's second series Gods and Warriors is set during the Bronze Age. It tells the story of Hylas, a 12-year-old goatherd, whose adventures take him to Ancient Crete and Ancient Egypt, and Pirra, the daughter of a high priestess with a crescent shaped scar on her cheek. The story crucially features animals in the plot – a lion, a falcon, and a dolphin; the dolphin from the first book, the lion from the second book onwards, and the falcon from the third book onwards.

Books

Daughters of Eden trilogy 

 The Shadow Catcher (2002)
 Fever Hill (2004)
 The Serpent's Tooth (2005)

Chronicles of Ancient Darkness series 

 Wolf Brother (2004)
 Spirit Walker (2005)
 Soul Eater (2006)
 Outcast (2007)
 Oath Breaker (2008)
 Ghost Hunter (2009)
 Viper's Daughter (2020)
 Skin Taker (2021)
 Wolfbane (2022)

Gods and Warriors series 

 The Outsiders (2013)/Gods and Warriors (2012 – Only first print carries this name.)
 The Burning Shadow (2013)
 Eye of the Falcon (2014)
 The Crocodile Tomb (2015)
 Warrior Bronze (2016)

Stand-alone books 

Without Charity (2000)
A Place in the Hills (2001)
Dark Matter (2010)
Thin Air (2016)
Wakenhyrst (2019)

References

External links 
 
 
 
 The Clan, fan website with participation by Paver

1960 births
Living people
21st-century British women writers
Alumni of Lady Margaret Hall, Oxford
British children's writers
British women children's writers
Guardian Children's Fiction Prize winners
Malawian writers
People educated at Wimbledon High School
British people of Flemish descent
British people of South African descent
British historical novelists
British women novelists
Women science fiction and fantasy writers
British fantasy writers
British horror writers
Women horror writers
Malawian women writers